You Put the Hurt On Me is an EP released by the Spencer Davis Group in 1965 as Fontana Records, TE 17444, with liner notes by Chris Blackwell.  The disc peaked on the British EP charts at # 4 in October 1965.

Songs
 "She Put the Hurt On Me" (L. Nelson)
 "I'm Getting Better" (E. Bruce)
 "I'll Drown In My Own Tears", (Henry Glover)
 "Goodbye Stevie" (Steve Winwood)
Fontana Records, a BPR Production, TE 17444 (1965)

Personnel
 Spencer Davis, vocals, rhythm guitar
 Stevie Winwood, vocals, piano and lead guitar
 Muff Winwood, bass guitar
 Pete York, drums

References

1962 EPs
Fontana Records EPs
The Spencer Davis Group albums